Tylwch railway station was a station in Tylwch, Powys, Wales. The station was closed in 1962.

On 16 September 1899, an accident happened at the station in which a mail train collided with an excursion train. Five people were seriously injured and a 24-year-old woman died in the incident.

References

Further reading

Disused railway stations in Powys
Railway stations in Great Britain opened in 1864
Railway stations in Great Britain closed in 1962
Former Cambrian Railway stations